Egstow is an area of Clay Cross, Derbyshire, England. The civil parish of Egstow was created in 1894 as part of Clay Cross Urban District, and comprised areas formerly in Pilsley and Woodthorpe; the parish was expanded in 1898 with an area transferred from North Wingfield, and was abolished in 1935. Egstow Hall is nearby, in the civil parish of Tupton.

References

See also
 List of places in Derbyshire

 A History of Egstow Hall

North East Derbyshire District
Former civil parishes in Derbyshire